Tactical Vehicle Intercept Unit (abbreviated as TVCU) was a unit that existed between 2010 and 2016. It was set up as part of Greater Manchester Police's Road Policing Unit (RPU) to combat vehicle crime in the metropolitan county of Greater Manchester in North West England. The unit uses high powered, unmarked vehicles, including Subaru Impreza rally cars with hi- tech equipment including the ProVida camera system and audio/ visual warning systems.

The TVIU featured on the BBC One documentary "X Cars" in the 1990s and later "Car Wars" in 2006 and early 2007.

References

Greater Manchester Police